In classic boats and ships, the forefoot is a part connecting the keel to the stem.

References

Shipbuilding